Ctenopseustis servana is a species of moth of the family Tortricidae. It is found in New Zealand, where it has been recorded from the North Island and the Three Kings Islands.

The larvae are polyphagous, feeding on various woody coastal angiosperms.

References

Moths described in 1863
Archipini
Moths of New Zealand